Vuča Žikić (mid-18th century – 14 April 1808), known as Captain Žika, was an important figure in the First Serbian Uprising. He was the founder, builder and commander of Deligrad fortification.

Life
As a young man Žikić left his native Mavrovo and came to Belgrade where he worked as an innkeeper and a sheep herdsman. Already in 1787, he was conspiring with Austrian spies to open the gates of the Water Gate of Belgrade Fortress to Austrian soldiers. In the Austrian-Ottoman war of 1788-1791 he joined the Serbian Free Corps unit of Mihaljević and distinguished himself earning the rank of captain. After the war he escaped to Srem and lived in the village of Boljevci. He later took part in the Austrian-French war.

Despite the fact that he built his career in Austrian service, after the start of the First Serbian Uprising in 1804, Žikić immediately returned to Serbia. He is credited for establishing the Deligrad fortification (together with Petar Dobrnjac, his commander), in 1806. As an experienced officer with some talent for building, Žikić turned Deligrad into the strongest defensive point in the Morava valley. Žikić is also supposed to have given it the name. He commanded the troops stationed in the fortification, mostly from Niš and Leskovac until his death

On Easter Friday in 1808 the Turks launched a sneak attack on Deligrad. The attack was repulsed but Žikić was mortally wounded. He was taken to the nearby Monastery of St. Roman where he died on Easter Day. That is also where he was buried.

His position in Deligrad was taken by his nephew Kuzman, son of his brother Anko.

Family
Žikić married twice. From his first marriage he had three sons – Ilija, Anko and Miloš. From the second one he had sons Vučo and Damijan.

Annotations

See also
 List of Serbian Revolutionaries

References

Sources

  

18th-century Serbian people
19th-century Serbian people
People of the First Serbian Uprising
Habsburg Serbs
People from Mavrovo and Rostuša Municipality
Serbs of North Macedonia
18th-century births
Year of birth unknown
1808 deaths
18th-century Freikorps
Serbs from the Ottoman Empire
Serbian revolutionaries